AI Foundation was an American artificial intelligence company founded by Lars Buttler and Rob Meadows, developing ethical artificial intelligent agents individuals can train. The company had offices in San Francisco and in Las Vegas; it was started in 2017 and had been operating in stealth until it was first publicly reported in September 2018 by Variety and VentureBeat.

Company overview 
AI Foundation is funded by Founders Fund, You & Mr Jones, Endeavor and Twitter co-founder Biz Stone.

At the One Young World conference started by David Jones, founder of You & Mr. Jones, Biz Stone and AI Foundation unveiled several prototypes such as a digital clone of Richard Branson.

On the Tonight Show with Jimmy Fallon, Deepak Chopra showed off his digital AI version of himself, developed the AI Foundation, which took Jimmy Fallon and the audience through a guided meditation. Deepak's AI was aptly called Digital Deepak and "will offer you advice whenever you need it" according to CNBC.

Many media sites were discussing where the future lies with technology like this, such as customer service. USA Today wrote an optimistic viewpoint of how this tech can improve lives via a digital replica of your aging parent or yourself and many other examples.

Responsibility 
The first product AI Foundation released was called Reality Defender. According to the Verge, Reality Defender will, "...alert users to misinformation by scanning images and videos on the webpages they’re looking at and flagging any doctored content." However, researchers think this may not be enough and the technology and techniques needs to expand further.

See also 

 Mind uploading
 Digital twin
 Chatbot
 Digital immortality
 Distributed cognition
 Transhumanism

References 

Artificial intelligence laboratories